Atemi waza (当て身技) or body-striking techniques were the strikes from the several ancient traditional Japanese jujitsu styles that were adopted in judo by its designer Jigorō Kanō in 1882 after a comprehensive study, accompanied by uke waza or defending blocks and parries. When judo further developed as a sports discipline, these techniques were excluded from its competition repertoire, which limits itself mainly to throws (nage waza) and holds (katame waza): although taught within self-defense, kata and sometimes used within informal randori, striking techniques are forbidden in the sport judo competitions rules.

Kanō thought deeply of atemi waza and its relationship with nage waza. 
Since he wanted to keep its practical character of martial art as well as its nature of physical and moral education, when compiling the nage nokata or randori-no-kata, his classical repertoire of 40 throws in the gokyo no waza (five sets of techniques), the standard syllabus of throwing techniques, he introduced four counterattack techniques against atemi waza: seoi nage, uki goshi, ura nage and yoko guruma.

He distinguished a number or 23 body-striking techniques:

Ude-Ate-waza: arm striking techniques

 Empi-uchi: Elbow blow
 Kami-ate: Upward blow
 Kirioroshi: Downward knife hand blow
 Naname-ate: Front crossing blow
 Naname-uchi: Slanting knife hand blow
 Ryogan-tsuki: throat strike - Strike both eyes with fingertips
 Shimo-tsuki: Downward blow
 Tsukiage: Uppercut
 Tsukidashi: Stomach punch with fingertips
 Tsukkake: Straight punch
 Uchioroshi: Downward strike
 Ushiro-ate: Rear elbow strike
 Ushiro-sumi-tsuki: Rear corner blow
 Ushiro-tsuki: Rear blow
 Ushiro-uchi: Rear blow
 Yoko-ate: Side blow
 Yoko-uchi: Side blow

Ashi-Ate-waza: Leg striking techniques

 Mae-ate: Front knee
 Mae-geri: Front kick
 Naname-geri: Roundhouse kick
 Taka-geri: High Front kick
 Ushiro-geri: Backward kick
 Yoko-geri: Side kick

References

Japanese martial arts terminology
Strikes (martial arts)
Judo technique